Plainfield Riding and Driving Club was a horse riding club in Plainfield, New Jersey. It held an annual horse show starting in 1903.

References

Plainfield, New Jersey
Equestrian venues in the United States
Sports venues in New Jersey